László Szilágyi (born 3 July 1981) is a Hungarian judoka.

Achievements

External links
 

1981 births
Living people
Hungarian male judoka
Universiade medalists in judo
Universiade bronze medalists for Hungary
Medalists at the 2001 Summer Universiade
21st-century Hungarian people